is a town in Chita District, Aichi Prefecture, Japan. , the town had an estimated population of 17,393 in 7338 households, and a population density of 453 persons per km2.

Geography
Minamichita is located in the extreme southern tip of Chita Peninsula in southern Aichi Prefecture, including a number of islands in Mikawa Bay. The town is bordered by Mikawa Bay to the east, and Ise Bay to the west. Part of the town's area are within the borders of the Mikawa Wan Quasi-National Park.

Neighboring municipalities
Aichi Prefecture
Mihama

Demographics
Per Japanese census data, the population of Minamichita had been declining steadily over the past 70 years.

Climate
The town has a climate characterized by hot and humid summers, and relatively mild winters (Köppen climate classification Cfa).

History
The area of Minamichita was part of Owari Province and controlled by Owari Domain under the Edo period Tokugawa shogunate. It was a major port on the coastal trade route between Edo and Osawa. After the Meiji restoration, it was organized into villages within Chita District, Aichi with the establishment of the modern municipalities system.

The modern town of Minamichita was established on June 1, 1961, through the merger of the towns of Utsumi, Mihama, and Morozaki, and the villages of Shinojima and Himakajima, all within Chita District. During March 2006, discussions were held to merge Minamichita with the town of Mihama to the north to form the new city of “Minamicentrair” after the popular nickname for Chūbu Centrair International Airport, but the merger proposal was strongly opposed by the majority of the inhabitants of Minamichita, and the merger did not take place.

Economy

The primary sector dominates the economy of Minamichita, notably commercial fishing and agriculture. Secondary industries include food processing, and seasonal tourism to beach resorts.

The Yamadera kiln (山寺窯) was located in Utsumi, today part of Minamichita. The kiln was active in the years Meiji 40 (1907) - Taishō 3 (1914). It produced Utsumi ware (内海焼).

Education
Minamichita has six public elementary schools and five public junior high schools operated by the town government, and one high school operated by the Aichi Prefectural Board of Education.

Transportation

Railway
 Meitetsu – Chita New Line

Highways
  Minamichita Road

Seaports
Morogizaki Port

Local attractions
Minamichita Onsen - hot spring resort
Himakajima - island in Mikawa Bay
Shinojima - island in Mikawa Bay

References

External links

 

 
Towns in Aichi Prefecture
Populated coastal places in Japan